Murvaul is a rural unincorporated community in south-central Panola County, Texas, United States, on Farm Road 10 and Murvaul Creek, 8 miles south of Carthage.

The area was settled by Europeans in the early 1860s. A post office operated there from 1874 to 1880 and from 1899 to 1918. In 1882, the reported population was 200. Circa 1900, the community served as a stop on the Texas and Gulf Railroad.

By the early 1990s, only a few scattered dwellings remained.

It is the birthplace of Tex Ritter.

External links
 
 Murvaul, Texas -- Handbook of Texas Online

Unincorporated communities in Panola County, Texas
Unincorporated communities in Texas